An Outstanding Natural Area is a protected area designation in the United States. The designations are managed by the Bureau of Land Management within the National Landscape Conservation System. Three ONAs have been designated by Congress, Jupiter Inlet Lighthouse, Piedras Blancas Historic Light Station, and Yaquina Head, all of which protect lighthouses and the adjacent land. The others were named by the BLM and have a variety of resources.

References

Bureau of Land Management areas
Parks
Protected areas of the United States
States of the United States-related lists